Boomerang is a pan-Asian cable and satellite television channel owned by Warner Bros. Discovery under its International division. Like the original US version, this localization first began as a programming block that aired on Cartoon Network Asia (from 2001 to 2005), before becoming its own channel in 2005.

On 1 December 2012, the channel was shut down and replaced with Toonami Asia. Eventually, the channel was relaunched on 1 January 2015 as part of Boomerang's 2015 global rebranding effort, replacing Cartoonito Asia.

Programming

Availability

Malaysia 
In Malaysia, Boomerang broadcasts via Astro & Unifi TV plus local advertisements from the service providers. Due to made decision following TA-DAA! cessation on Astro, the channel ceased on Astro on 1 February 2023, and was replaced by CBeebies, while Unifi TV still airs that channel.

Philippines 
In the Philippines, Boomerang broadcasts as a channel and also had a block on TV5 Kids that ran from September 2015 to October 2017. the channel is in Filipino.

Thailand 
In Thailand, Boomerang Asia has a localized feed in Thai that began broadcasting since 14 August 2013. Boomerang Asia's original feed launched on 14 March 2004 was broadcast in Thailand until the channel closed in December 2012. Boomerang Thailand can be viewed via TrueVisions. Boomerang Thailand is also the only Boomerang channel in the world which hasn't changed its logo & still uses the 2012 EMEA rebrand.

Indonesia 
In Indonesia, Boomerang Asia has been broadcast on Topas TV, Transvision (a subsidiary of CT Corp), and UseeTV (Telkom Indonesia). As of 1 March 2019, Boomerang Asia is also available on pay-TV such as MNC Vision (a subsidiary of MNC Group) and Skynindo, as well as free apps paid like Vision+ (under MNC). Some programs use Indonesian languages and are in English.

Vietnam 
In Vietnam, Boomerang Asia broadcasts in Vietnamese and localized Vietnamese commercials, Boomerang Vietnam also has an Official YouTube channel like the Thai feed.

Taiwan 
In Taiwan, Boomerang has broadcast since November 2016 and is in Taiwanese Mandarin.

Japan 
In Japan, Boomerang Asia has been available via satellite since 2004. It is broadcasts in Japanese. Boomerang Asia's original feed launched on 14 March 2004 was broadcast in Japan until the channel closed on 1 December 2012.

India 
In India, Boomerang was able to be viewed via DishTV India. the Indian feed ceased broadcasting on 2 March 2009 along with Turner Classic Movies Asia.

Boomerang on TV5 Kids 
A weekday afternoon, Boomerang-themed block ran on TV5 Kids from September 2015 and September 2017. Its programming came straight from the pan-Asian feed (with a few from the Boomerang channel in Australia and New Zealand), such as The Looney Tunes Show, Rat-A-Tat, Inspector Gadget, and Mr. Bean: The Animated Series.

Since October 2017, the Boomerang block on TV5 Network Philippines was dropped out due to preparing for the collaboration with the U.S.-based sports channel, ESPN; which is formerly in the Philippines since December 2017 (during the 2016–2017 PBA Governor's Cup Finals). It is called "ESPN5" (formerly "Sports5") until 8 March 2020, was rebranded as One Sports.

Former programming blocks

Boomeraction 
Boomeraction was a block which, as its name suggests, consisted of classic action-oriented shows such as Jonny Quest, Birdman and the Galaxy Trio, Sealab 2020 and among others. The block aired weekdays at 5:00 pm.

Boom! Boom! Boom! 
Boom! Boom! Boom! was an unstoppable weekend block with no commercial interruptions, featuring all-time toon favorites.

Tiny TV 
Tiny TV began airing on 1 March 2010, and was shown each weekday from 9:00 am to 2:00 pm. Previously, the block aired younger-skewing versions of classic Warner Bros. and Hanna-Barbera cartoons (such as The Flintstone Kids, Baby Looney Tunes, Tom & Jerry Kids, and A Pup Named Scooby-Doo), but eventually introduced other acquired toddler-themed cartoons like Postman Pat and Care Bears: Adventures in Care-a-lot.

Boomerang Theatre 
Boomerang Theatre is Boomerang's movie block, and is currently airing in the U.S.

Boomysteries 
Boomysteries is a mystery-themed late night block on weekends at 11:00 pm which features the strangest but mysterious toon stories ever.

Boomeracers 
Boomeracers was a car-racing-themed programming block that aired weekdays at 1:30 pm.

The Zoo 
The Zoo is an animal-themed programming block that aired weekdays at 9:00 to 11:00 am. As with Boomeracers, The Zoo was a spinoff of the Boomerang block of the same name, and has aired in the United Kingdom as well.

The Big Bucket 
The Big Bucket was Boomerang's marathon block. Started in June 2006, The Big Bucket featured a three-hour marathon of Boomerang's Character of the month.

Free Classic 
Free Classic was Boomerang's cartoon classic block. Started in July 2007, Free Classic featured a five-hour cartoon classic of Boomerang's Character of the month.

Logo history

References 

Boomerang (TV network)
Mass media in Southeast Asia
Warner Bros. Discovery Asia-Pacific
Children's television channels in the Asia Pacific
Television channels and stations established in 2005
Television channels and stations disestablished in 2012
Television channels and stations established in 2015
2009 disestablishments in India
Television stations in Singapore
Television stations in the Philippines
Television stations in Vietnam
Television stations in Hong Kong
Television stations in Taiwan
Television stations in Japan
Television stations in Malaysia
Television stations in Indonesia
Television stations in Macau